Murray McCheyne Thomson  (December 19, 1922 – May 2, 2019) was a Canadian peace activist 

Thomson was born in Honan, China where his parents were Christian missionaries.  Thomson founded many non-profits in Canada. He was the 1990 recipient of the Pearson Medal of Peace for his work in peace and justice and was made an Officer of the Order of Canada in 2001. He was also awarded the (Canadian) Golden Jubilee Medal and the Diamond Jubilee Medal He is a former Executive Director of CUSO.

He is credited in helping the formation of:
 Grindstone Island
 The Peacefund Canada Foundation (1980s) 
 Peace Brigades International (1981)
 Project Ploughshares (1976)
 Group of 78 (1980)
 Canadian Friends of Burma (1990)
 Canadians for a Nuclear Weapons Convention (2012)

Murray was a recognized international expert and advisor to governments, aid organizations, and lobbyists on disarmament and arms control.
He was significantly involved in starting the United Nations World Disarmament Campaign and drafting its policy document, which was passed by the United Nations General Assembly.
He continued to be active in advocating for disarmament into 2019.
For several years he led a campaign among members of the Order of Canada in calling for an international Nuclear Weapons Convention. Over 1,030 members of the Order have signed the statement as of May 2019.

He died on May 2, 2019, in Ottawa, Canada. 

His archives are held by  William Ready Division of Archives and Research Collections at McMaster University in Hamilton, Ontario.

Works 
 
A Time to Disarm: A Discussion Guide for Stimulating a National Dialogue on Canada and the UN's Special Session on Disarmament, 23 May - 28 June, 1978  By Ernie Regehr and Murray Thomson
Daring Confidence: The Life and Times of Andrew Thomson in China 1906–1942. By Murray Thomson
Toward a Culture of Peace: Can We Afford to Pay the Price?  By Murray Thomson

References

Further reading 
 
 
  (HTML)
 
 Peace activist Murray Thomson dies at 96

1922 births
2019 deaths
Canadian Christian pacifists
Canadian Quakers
Converts to Quakerism
20th-century Quakers
University of Toronto alumni
Peace award winners
Canadian humanitarians
Canadian expatriates in China